Tru FM is a South African commercial radio station based in the Eastern Cape.

The station is unique in the SABC PBS stable as it is the only station primarily targeting the youth with two languages of broadcast, IsiXhosa and English.

The station is a successor of CKI fm which itself was formerly known as Radio Ciskei. The station was rebranded and relaunched in 2008

Broadcast Languages
English
isiXhosa

Broadcast time
24/7

Listenership Figures

References

External links
Tru FM Website
SAARF Website
Sentech Website

Radio stations in South Africa
Mass media in the Eastern Cape
Radio stations established in 2008